"Clarabella" is a pop song composed by Frank Pingatore and recorded by the Jodimars (a group made of former members of Bill Haley & His Comets) in 1956. Today, it is best known for being recorded by the Beatles for the radio programme "Pop Go the Beatles" on 2 July 1963, which was broadcast on the 16th of that month. It was released commercially on compact disc much later, on the 1994 compilation album Live at the BBC, although years earlier a similar rendition by Billy Preston (who would later work with the Beatles on their later recordings) was performed on a 1965 episode of Shindig!. In 2003 the White Stripes recorded a performance of the song live in concert.

The Beatles personnel 
 Paul McCartney – vocals, bass
 John Lennon – harmonica, rhythm guitar
 George Harrison – lead guitar
 Ringo Starr – drums

See also 
 1963 in music
 Pop music

References 

The Beatles songs
1956 songs
Song recordings produced by George Martin